Michael Eugene Kreun is an American attorney and politician representing the 32nd district in the Minnesota Senate since 2023.

Education 
Kreun earned a Bachelor of Arts degree from Minnesota State University Moorhead and a Juris Doctor from the University of North Dakota School of Law.

Career 
Outside of politics, Kreun works as a lawyer. He also served as a member of the Spring Lake Park School Board and Coon Creek Watershed Board. Kreun was elected to the Minnesota Senate in November 2022.

References 

Living people
Republican Party Minnesota state senators
People from Blaine, Minnesota
Minnesota State University Moorhead alumni
University of North Dakota alumni
Minnesota lawyers
Year of birth missing (living people)